The Marriage Nest is a 1927 German silent film directed by Rudolf Walther-Fein and starring Livio Pavanelli, Harry Liedtke, and Wolfgang Zilzer.

The film's sets were designed by Botho Hoefer and August Rinaldi. It was made by the Berlin-based Aafa-Film.

Cast

References

Bibliography

External links

1927 films
Films of the Weimar Republic
Films directed by Rudolf Walther-Fein
German silent feature films
German black-and-white films
Films set in Austria-Hungary